Fellvatnet is a lake that lies in the municipality of Gildeskål in Nordland county, Norway.  The lake is located on the mainland of Norway, north of the large lake Storglomvatnet and the Svartisen glacier.  It is located in an isolated, uninhabited part of Gildeskål, south of the lake Langvatnet. It serves as a reservoir for the Langvann Hydroelectric Power Station.

See also
List of lakes in Norway

References

Lakes of Nordland
Gildeskål